Homerun is the debut studio album by Argentine rapper and singer Paulo Londra. It was released on 23 May 2019 by Warner Music Latina. It debuted at number two in Argentina and number three in Spain.

Track listing
All tracks are written by Paulo Ezequiel Londra, Cristian Salazar and Daniel Echevarría Oviedo, and produced by the latter, except where noted.

Personnel
Credits adapted from Tidal.

 Paulo Londra – primary vocals
 De La Ghetto – featured vocals (track 12)
 Justin Quiles – featured vocals (track 12)
 Lenny Tavárez – featured vocals (track 15)
 OvyOnTheDrums – production, recording engineering
 Dave Kutch – mastering (tracks 1–3, 5, 7–14, 16–18)
 Colin Leonard – mastering (track 4)
 Mosty – mastering (track 6), mixing (1–3, 5–13, 17–18)
 Wain – mastering (track 15), mixing (14–16)
 Juan Pablo Builes – mixing (tracks 1–3, 5–9, 11–12, 18)
 Jaycen Joshua – mixing (track 4)

Charts

Weekly charts

Year-end charts

Certifications

References

2019 debut albums
Paulo Londra albums
Spanish-language albums
Warner Music Latina albums